John Fletcher Richards was a member of the Wisconsin State Assembly.

Biography
Richards was born on August 4, 1818 in Franklin Township, Clermont County, Ohio. He was a physician.

Assembly career
Richards was a member of the Assembly during the 1872 session. He was a Republican.

References

People from Clermont County, Ohio
Politicians from Milwaukee
People from Monroe County, Wisconsin
Republican Party members of the Wisconsin State Assembly
Physicians from Wisconsin
1818 births
Year of death missing